Angelina Mikhaylovna Vovk  (born September 16, 1942) is a former presenter for the Soviet Central Television active from 1980, best known for years on Good Night, Little Ones! and Pesnya goda. She was awarded People's Artist of the Russian Federation (2006).

References

External links
 Ангелина Вовк. Когда отец — герой. Воспоминания Ангелины Вовк о военном детстве // angelina-tihonova.ru
 Поздравительная телеграмма Президента Российской Федерации В. Путина от 16 сентября 2012 года Ангелине Михайловне Вовк // kremlin.ru

1942 births
Living people
People from Tulun
Soviet television presenters
Russian television presenters
Honored Artists of the RSFSR
People's Artists of Russia
Soviet actresses
Russian actresses
Russian Academy of Theatre Arts alumni
Radio and television announcers
Russian women television presenters
20th-century Russian women